Ganesh is a 1998 Indian Telugu-language action drama film produced by D. Suresh Babu under the Suresh Productions banner, directed by Thirupathisamy. It stars Venkatesh, Rambha and Madhu Bala, with music composed by Mani Sharma.

The film received five Nandi Awards, including the Nandi Award for Best Actor. Venkatesh also won the Filmfare Best Actor Award (Telugu).

Plot
Ganesh is a journalist whose family and life are affected by corrupt politicians. He is planning how to take revenge and change the system.

Cast

Soundtrack

Music composed by Mani Sharma. Music released on ADITYA Music Company.

Awards 
Nandi Awards - 1998
 Third Best Feature Film - Bronze - D. Suresh Babu
 Best Actor - Venkatesh 
 Best Villain - Kota Srinivasa Rao 
 Best Dialogue Writer - Paruchuri brothers 
 Best Makeup Artist - Raghava

Filmfare Awards South
 Best Actor – Telugu - Venkatesh - won

References

External links

1998 films
1998 action drama films
Films about corruption in India
Indian action drama films
Films scored by Mani Sharma
1990s Telugu-language films
1998 drama films
Suresh Productions films